The 1996 Calder Cup playoffs of the American Hockey League began on April 19, 1996. The sixteen teams that qualified, eight from each conference, played best-of-five series for division semifinals and best-of-seven series for division finals and conference finals. The conference champions played a best-of-seven series for the Calder Cup. The Calder Cup Final ended on June 13, 1996, with the Rochester Americans defeating the Portland Pirates four games to three to win the sixth Calder Cup in team history. Rochester's Dixon Ward won the Jack A. Butterfield Trophy as AHL playoff MVP.

The Saint John Flames set an AHL playoff record by winning six games in overtime. This record was equaled by the Milwaukee Admirals in 2004.

Playoff seeds
After the 1995-96 AHL regular season, 16 teams qualified for the playoffs. The top four teams from each division qualified for the playoffs. However, due to the uneven number of teams in the each conference, it was possible for the fifth-placed team in the five team divisions to crossover to the playoffs for the four team divisions. This could only happen if the fifth-placed team in a five team division earned more points than the fourth-placed team in the four team division in the same conference. In this case, the fifth-placed team from the five team division would play in place of the fourth-placed team from the four team division in that part of the playoff bracket. The Albany River Rats were the Southern Conference regular season champions and also had the best overall record for the regular season. The Springfield Falcons were the Northern Conference regular season champions.

Northern Conference

Atlantic Division
Prince Edward Island Senators - 85 points
Saint John Flames - 85 points
St. John's Maple Leafs - 80 points
Fredericton Canadiens - 79 points

Northern Division
Springfield Falcons - Northern Conference regular season champions, 100 points
Worcester IceCats - 88 points
Portland Pirates - 78 points
Providence Bruins - 74 points

Southern Conference

Central Division
Albany River Rats - Southern Conference regular season champions; Best regular season record, 115 points
Adirondack Red Wings - 86 points
Rochester Americans - 83 points
Cornwall Aces - 80 points
Syracuse Crunch - 74 points (Played in the South Division bracket by virtue of earning more points than the fourth-placed team in that division)

Southern Division
Binghamton Rangers - 88 points
Hershey Bears - 86 points
Baltimore Bandits - 77 points

Bracket

In each round the team that earned more points during the regular season receives home ice advantage, meaning they receive the "extra" game on home-ice if the series reaches the maximum number of games. There is no set series format due to arena scheduling conflicts and travel considerations.

Division Semifinals
Note 1: All times are in Eastern Time (UTC-4).
Note 2: Game times in italics signify games to be played only if necessary.
Note 3: Home team is listed first.
Note 4: The number of overtime periods played (where applicable) is not specified

Northern Conference

Atlantic Division

(A1) Prince Edward Island Senators vs. (A4) Fredericton Canadiens

(A2) Saint John Flames vs. (A3) St. John's Maple Leafs

Northern Division

(N1) Springfield Falcons vs. (N4) Providence Bruins

(N2) Worcester IceCats vs. (N3) Portland Pirates

Southern Conference

Central Division

(C1) Albany River Rats vs. (C4) Cornwall Aces

(C2) Adirondack Red Wings vs. (C3) Rochester Americans

Southern Division

(S1) Binghamton Rangers vs. (C5) Syracuse Crunch

(S2) Hershey Bears vs. (S3) Baltimore Bandits

Division Finals

Northern Conference

Atlantic Division

(A2) Saint John Flames vs. (A4) Fredericton Canadiens

Northern Division

(N1) Springfield Falcons vs. (N3) Portland Pirates

Southern Conference

Central Division

(C3) Rochester Americans vs. (C4) Cornwall Aces

Southern Division

(S3) Baltimore Bandits vs. (C5) Syracuse Crunch

Conference finals

Northern Conference

(A2) Saint John Flames vs. (N3) Portland Pirates

Southern Conference

(C3) Rochester Americans vs. (C5) Syracuse Crunch

Calder Cup Final

(C3) Rochester Americans vs. (N3) Portland Pirates

See also
1995–96 AHL season
List of AHL seasons

References

Calder Cup
Calder Cup playoffs